Kazachye is a rural locality (a selo), the only inhabited locality, and the administrative center of Kazachinsky National Rural Okrug of Bulunsky District in the Sakha Republic, Russia, located  from Tiksi, the administrative center of the district. Its population as of the 2010 Census was 1,367, of whom 665 were male and 702 female, down from 1,531 recorded during the 2002 Census.

References

Notes

Sources
Official website of the Sakha Republic. Registry of the Administrative-Territorial Divisions of the Sakha Republic. Ust-Yansky District. 

Rural localities in Bulunsky District